John Wayne Burtt (born 11 June 1944) is a former cricketer who played first-class cricket for Canterbury in New Zealand from 1966 to 1975.

Burtt's father, Noel Burtt, played first-class cricket for Canterbury, as did his uncle, Tom Burtt, who also played Test cricket. A middle-order batsman and occasional leg-spin bowler, Wayne Burtt made his Plunket Shield debut in the fourth match of the 1965–66 season and was never out of the Canterbury side until he moved to Central Districts at the end of the 1972–73 season. In his first match for Canterbury he made 53 and took 4 for 49 as Central Districts hung on for a draw.

He had his most productive season in 1967–68 when he scored 416 runs at an average of 46.22, including his only century, 130 not out against Wellington. Towards the end of the season he was selected to play for a New Zealand Cricket Council President's XI against the touring Indian team, scoring 33 and 71 in a low-scoring match.

He represented South Island twice in 1968–69 – in a trial match against North Island and against the touring West Indies team – but with only moderate success. He spent two seasons with Central Districts in 1973–74 and 1974–75 but was less successful there than with Canterbury, and he retired after the 1974–75 season. He represented Taranaki in the Hawke Cup from 1974 to 1980.

References

External links
 
 

1944 births
Living people
New Zealand cricketers
Canterbury cricketers
Central Districts cricketers
Cricketers from Christchurch
South Island cricketers